The 2004 European Fencing Championships were held in Copenhagen. The event took place from 29 June to 4 July 2004.

Medal summary

Men's events

Women's events

Medal table

References 
 Results at the European Fencing Confederation

2004
European Fencing Championships
2004 European Fencing Championships
European Fencing Championships
2004 in Copenhagen
Fencing competitions in Denmark
July 2004 sports events in Europe